Congolese immigration to Brazil from the Democratic Republic of the Congo is a new phenomenon caused by the wars and conflicts in the country, causing many to flee the country.

The Congolese people in Brazil are found mostly in the favelas or the outskirts of Rio de Janeiro.

The Congolese people are one of the most underpaid immigrants in Brazil. They also have to deal with violence, racism and xenophobia.

See also 

 Congolese diaspora
 Murder of Moïse Mugenyi Kabagambe

References 

Brazil–Democratic Republic of the Congo relations
Democratic Republic of the Congo refugees
Ethnic groups in Brazil
Democratic Republic of the Congo diaspora